"I Got My Education" is the first single released from the Uncanny Alliance LP, The Groove Won't Bite, released as a CD single and 12".  The song went to number two for two weeks on the US dance chart.

The song, which is said to be a response to the Crystal Waters track "Gypsy Woman (She's Homeless)", mostly consists of spoken word vocal samples performed by lead singer/vocalist E.V. Mystique. She is speaking to an unidentified female character who has apparently lost her job after giving her boss a bad attitude, resulting in homelessness. The song has a high camp value and was very popular in gay dance clubs. A sample lyric: "Attitude, attitude was all she sent/Now she can't afford antiperspirant/Books and school just give you the blues/But oh, dear girl, where are your shoes?"

The single was first released as a white label 12" vinyl single given out to club DJ's. The song became so popular that record labels began vying to sign the band. During this process, the single was heavily bootlegged and sold by unscrupulous individuals who obtained the promotional white label single. As a result, when it was finally released by A&M records on an official 12" and CD single, a new version entitled "Bootleggers Response" was included as a b-side. In this version the theme of the song is changed to address the actual bootlegger, accusing him of being forced to make money by bootlegging because he didn't get an education. A sample lyrics: "Are you a person with morals or couth who brushes their teeth in the morning?/Do you even have teeth?/Maybe with the money you made from the bootleg you can go and buy yourself...*A* tooth."

A music video was produced featuring Mystique portraying both herself and the "Miss Thing" subject of the lyrics. It takes place primarily in a classroom setting and parodies several other videos including "Mediate" by INXS and "People Are Still Having Sex" by LaTour.

References

Uncanny Alliance songs
1992 debut singles
1992 songs
A&M Records singles
Songs about homelessness
Songs written by David Cole (record producer)